Richard Brickell (born 29 October 1975 in Newbury, Berkshire, England) is a sport shooter who represented Great Britain at the 2004 Summer Olympics and the 2012 Summer Olympics and 2010 Commonwealth Games in Delhi where he won both individual Gold and Bronze medals in the pairs event.

At the 2004 Summer Olympics in Athens he participated in the men's skeet event, finishing tied for 34th position. At the 2012 Summer Olympics in London he also participated in the men's skeet event.  This time he finished in 12th position.

References

1975 births
Living people
People from Newbury, Berkshire
British male sport shooters
Skeet shooters
Olympic shooters of Great Britain
Shooters at the 2004 Summer Olympics
Shooters at the 2012 Summer Olympics
Shooters at the 2002 Commonwealth Games
Shooters at the 2006 Commonwealth Games
Shooters at the 2010 Commonwealth Games
Commonwealth Games medallists in shooting
Commonwealth Games gold medallists for England
Commonwealth Games silver medallists for England
Commonwealth Games bronze medallists for England
Medallists at the 2002 Commonwealth Games
Medallists at the 2006 Commonwealth Games
Medallists at the 2010 Commonwealth Games